Hokey Fright is the only studio album by The Uncluded, a collaboration between rapper Aesop Rock and anti-folk singer-songwriter Kimya Dawson. It was released on May 7, 2013 on the Rhymesayers Entertainment label. Every part of every song on the album is performed by either Aesop or Dawson, with the exception of the drums on "Delicate Cycle", which were played by James McNew of Yo La Tengo.

Reception

According to Metacritic, Hokey Fright has a score of 79 out of 100, indicating "generally favorable reviews" from critics. Robert Christgau named it the second best album of 2013 in his year-end list for The Barnes & Noble Review and the twelfth best album of the 2010s. It was listed by Rolling Stone as one of the "27 Best Albums You Didn't Hear in 2013".

Track listing

Charts

References

External links
 

2013 debut albums
Collaborative albums
Aesop Rock albums
Rhymesayers Entertainment albums
Kimya Dawson albums